Alberto Breccia Guzzo (3 July 1946 – 1 December 2014) was a Uruguayan politician and lawyer. He served in the Chamber of Deputies of Uruguay representing the Broad Front party. Breccia was born in Montevideo, Uruguay.

Breccia died in Montevideo, Uruguay, aged 68.

References

1946 births
2014 deaths
Broad Front (Uruguay) politicians
20th-century Uruguayan lawyers
People from Montevideo